Jordan Park is a public park along the Jordan River in Salt Lake City, Utah, United States.

Description
The park is located at 900 West & 1000 South. The International Peace Gardens are located within the park.

References

External links

 
 Jordan Park at SLC.gov

Parks in Salt Lake City